Trois-Ponts (both literally Three Bridges) is a municipality of Wallonia located in the province of Liège, Belgium. 

On January 1, 2006, Trois-Ponts had a total population of 2,445. The total area is 68.90 km² which gives a population density of 35 inhabitants per km². It is situated at the confluence of the rivers Amblève and Salm.

The municipality consists of the following districts: Basse-Bodeux, Fosse, and Wanne.

A railway junction at Trois-Ponts connected the Vennbahn with the Liège-Troisvierges, Luxembourg line.

See also
 List of protected heritage sites in Trois-Ponts
 Coo-Trois-Ponts Hydroelectric Power Station

References

External links
 

 
Municipalities of Liège Province